The 1947–48 FA Cup was the 67th staging of the world's oldest football cup competition, the Football Association Challenge Cup, commonly known as the FA Cup. Manchester United won the competition for only the second time, beating Blackpool 4–2 in the final at Wembley.

Matches were scheduled to be played at the stadium of the team named first on the date specified for each round, which was always a Saturday. Some matches, however, might be rescheduled for other days if there were clashes with games for other competitions or the weather was inclement. If scores were level after 90 minutes had been played, a replay would take place at the stadium of the second-named team later the same week. If the replayed match was drawn further replays would be held until a winner was determined. If scores were level after 90 minutes had been played in a replay, a 30-minute period of extra time would be played.

Calendar

First round proper

At this stage 41 clubs from the Football League Third Division North and South joined 25 non-league clubs who had advanced through the qualifying rounds. Rotherham United and Queens Park Rangers, as the strongest non-promoted Third Division finishers in the previous season, were given a bye to the third round, along with Swansea Town. To make the number of matches up, non-league Leytonstone and Wimbledon, the previous season's F. A. Amateur Cup winners and runners-up respectively, were given byes to this round. 34 matches were scheduled to be played on Saturday, 29 November 1947. Six were drawn and went to replays.

Second round proper
The matches were played on Saturday, 13 December 1947. Seven matches were drawn, with replays taking place the following Saturday. One of these then went to a second replay.

Third round proper
The 44 First and Second Division clubs entered the competition at this stage, along with Rotherham United, Queens Park Rangers and Swansea Town. The matches were scheduled for Saturday, 10 January 1948. Two matches were drawn and went to replays on the following Saturday.

Fourth round proper
The matches were scheduled for Saturday, 24 January 1948. One game was drawn and went to a replay, which was played on the following Saturday.

Fifth round proper
The matches were scheduled for Saturday, 7 February 1948. There was one replay, taking place the following Saturday.

Sixth round proper
The four quarter-final ties were scheduled to be played on Saturday, 28 February 1948. There was one replay, in the QPR–Derby County match.

Semifinals
The semi-final matches were played on Saturday, 13 March 1948. Manchester United and Blackpool won their ties to meet in the final at Wembley. The gate receipts for the tie at Villa Park were £18,817 a record at the time for that ground.

Final

The 1948 FA Cup final was contested by Manchester United and Blackpool at Wembley Stadium on 24 April 1948. Both teams played in a changed strip, Blackpool in white shirts and blue shorts and Manchester United in unfamiliar blue shirts and white shorts. Stanley Matthews was playing his first season for Blackpool and they led the favourites 2-1 only to lose to United, who hadn't appeared in an FA Cup final for 39 years, won 4–2, with two goals from Jack Rowley and one apiece from Stan Pearson and John Anderson. Eddie Shimwell and Stan Mortensen scored Blackpool's goals. With his goal, Shimwell became the first full-back to score at Wembley whilst Stan Mortensen maintained his record of scoring in every round. The cup had gone to United in a game that many critics still rate as the best footballing final ever seen at Wembley Stadium. One reporter David Pole, commented; "If United's display was as close to perfection as any team could hope to go, Blackpool's was not far behind."

Match details

See also
FA Cup final results 1872-

References
General
Official site; fixtures and results service at TheFA.com
1947-48 FA Cup at rssf.com
1947-48 FA Cup at soccerbase.com

Specific

 
FA Cup seasons